Bangladesh participated in the 1982 Asian Games which were held in Delhi, India from November 19, 1982, to December 4, 1982.

Football

Group C

 Bangladesh did not advance in next stage.

Field hockey

Men

Group A

Classification 5th–8th

 China beat Bangladesh in the field hockey.

7th place match

 Bangladesh ranked 7th in the field hockey.

Volleyball

Men

Group A

 Bangladesh did not advance in next stage and ranked 14th in the Volleyball.

Water polo

Men

Group B

 Bangladesh did not advance in next stage.

See also
 Bangladesh at the Asian Games
 Bangladesh at the Olympics

References

Nations at the 1982 Asian Games
1982
Asian Games